The Shire of Rutherglen was a local government area about  north-northeast of Melbourne, the state capital of Victoria, Australia.

History

Rutherglen was incorporated as a road district on 12 September 1862, and became a shire on 16 June 1871. Part of its Lilliput Riding was lost to the Shire of Chiltern in February 1917.

On 18 November 1994, the Shire of Rutherglen was abolished, and along with parts of the Shires of Beechworth, Chiltern and Yackandandah, was merged into the newly created Shire of Indigo.

Wards

Rutherglen was divided into three wards, each of which elected three councillors:
 Central Ward
 East Ward
 West Ward

Towns and localities
 Browns Plains
 Cornishtown
 Gooramadda
 Great Northern
 Lilliput
 Prentice North
 Rutherglen*
 Wahgunyah (opposite Corowa, New South Wales)

* Council seat.

Population

* Estimate in the 1958 Victorian Year Book.

References

External links
 Victorian Places - Rutherford

Rutherglen
1862 establishments in Australia